Carlos Alberto Gomes de Jesus (born 11 December 1984), commonly known as just Carlos Alberto, is a Brazilian football pundit and retired footballer who played as an attacking midfielder, but who could also play as a second striker. He was known for his technique, dribbling ability, balance on the ball and two-footedness.

Career
Carlos Alberto started his career with Fluminense, where he won the Campeonato Carioca in 2002. He moved on to FC Porto under coach José Mourinho in January 2004. There, he won the Portuguese Championship and the UEFA Champions League, where he scored the first goal in the 3–0 win over AS Monaco in the final match.

In the beginning of 2005, he moved to Corinthians who signed a partnership with MSI, where he won the Brasileirão in 2005 being one of the major players of the team. In 2006 Corinthians did poorly in all competitions and Carlos Alberto lost a lot of room in the team and after a long fight with Corinthians manager Emerson Leão, which peaked at a Copa Sul-Americana game against Club Atlético Lanús. He stated he would never again play in Corinthians as long as Leão remained as manager. He was loaned out to Fluminense from January to December 2007, being the team captain in their Copa do Brasil title.

He joined Werder Bremen in July 2007 with a deal of reported €7.8m which was a club record. He signed a four-year contract. The move did not work out for either club or player however, as he suffered with insomnia, and returned to Brazil on numerous loan spells.

In January 2008 he was loaned out to São Paulo but he was excluded from the squad for disciplinary reasons in April 2008 three months before his contract ended. In May 2008, he signed another loan contract with Botafogo until June 2009 but on 12 November 2008, he left the club because of outstanding salary payments. On 7 January 2009, he was loaned out yet again, this time to CR Vasco da Gama for 6 months until 30 June 2009. Later he signed for another year on loan with Vasco da Gama. In June 2010 his contract with Werder Bremen was mutually terminated. He signed a three-year contract with Vasco da Gama until June 2013.

On 14 January 2015, Carlos Alberto joined Emirati club Al Dhafra on a one-year contract. 15 days later, however, the move collapsed and he returned to Brazil.

On 24 April 2015, he joined Figueirense along with Felipe.

On 13 January 2017, he signed a one-year contract with Atlético Paranaense.

In 2019, after being without a club for a year, Carlos Alberto joined Boavista playing in the Campeonato Carioca.

In June 2019, he announced his retirement.

Career statistics

Club

International

Honours
Fluminense
Campeonato Carioca: 2002
Copa do Brasil: 2007

Porto
Primeira Liga: 2003–04
Supertaça Cândido de Oliveira: 2004
UEFA Champions League: 2003–04
Intercontinental Cup: 2004

Corinthians
 Campeonato Brasileiro Série A: 2005

Vasco da Gama
Campeonato Brasileiro Série B: 2009

Individual
Carioca Team of the Year: 2009

References

External links

 

Living people
1984 births
Association football midfielders
Brazil international footballers
Fluminense FC players
Sport Club Corinthians Paulista players
São Paulo FC players
Botafogo de Futebol e Regatas players
CR Vasco da Gama players
Grêmio Foot-Ball Porto Alegrense players
Esporte Clube Bahia players
Goiás Esporte Clube players
Figueirense FC players
FC Porto players
SV Werder Bremen players
Bundesliga players
Campeonato Brasileiro Série A players
Campeonato Brasileiro Série B players
Primeira Liga players
2003 CONCACAF Gold Cup players
UEFA Champions League winning players
Brazilian expatriate footballers
Brazilian expatriate sportspeople in Germany
Expatriate footballers in Germany
Brazilian expatriate sportspeople in the United Arab Emirates
Expatriate footballers in the United Arab Emirates
Footballers from Rio de Janeiro (city)
Brazilian footballers